Karachay-Balkar, or Mountain Turkic, is a Turkic language spoken by the Karachays and Balkars in Kabardino-Balkaria and Karachay–Cherkessia, European Russia, as well as by an immigrant population in Afyonkarahisar Province, Turkey. The modern Karachay-Balkar written language is based on the Karachay-Baksan-Chegem dialect. The language is closely related to Kumyk.

Writing 
Historically, the Arabic alphabet had been used by first writers until 1924. Handwritten manuscripts of the Balkar poet Kazim Mechiev and other examples of literature have preserved to this day. First printed books in Karachay-Balkar language were published In the beginning of 20th century.

After the October Revolution as part of a state campaign of Latinisation Karachay and Balkar educators developed a new alphabet based on Latin letters. In 1930s, the official Soviet policy was revised and the process of Cyrillization the languages of USSR peoples was started. In 1937–38 the new alphabet based on Cyrillic letters was officially adopted.

Alphabet 
Modern Karachay-Balkar Cyrillic alphabet:

 * Not found in native vocabulary

In Kabardino-Balkaria, they write ж instead of дж, while in Karachay-Cherkessia, they write нъ instead of нг. In some publications, especially during the Soviet period, the letter у́ or ў is used for the sound .

Karachay-Balkar Latin alphabet:

Phonology 

Parentheses indicate allophones.

Grammar

Nominals

Cases

Possessive suffixes

Language example
Article 1 of the Universal Declaration of Human Rights in Karachay-Balkar:

Numerals

Loanwords
Loanwords from Ossetian, Kabardian, Arabic, and Persian are fairly numerous.

In popular culture
Russian filmmaker Andrei Proshkin used Karachay-Balkar for The Horde, believing that it might be the closest language to the original Kipchak language which was spoken during the Golden Horde.

Bibliography
 Chodiyor Doniyorov and Saodat Doniyorova. Parlons Karatchay-Balkar. Paris: Harmattan, 2005. .
 Steve Seegmiller (1996) Karachay (LINCOM)

References

External links

 Russian-Karachay-Balkar On-Line Dictionary (a)
 Russian-Karachay-Balkar On-Line Dictionary (b)
 "Заман" newspaper
 "Къарачай" newspaper
 "Минги Тау" magazine

Agglutinative languages
Kipchak languages
Languages of Russia
Kabardino-Balkaria
Karachay-Cherkessia
Languages of the Caucasus
Western Kipchak
Languages written in Cyrillic script
Turkic languages